Qarah Guzlu or Qarah Gowzlu may refer to:
 Qarah Guzlu-ye Olya
 Qarah Guzlu-ye Sofla